Edward Goodwin (by 1503–1548/50), of East Grinstead, Sussex, was an English politician.

Family
The Goodwins were influential in the town of East Grinstead. Edward Goodwin married a woman named Margaret, and they had three sons and two daughters.

Career
He was a Member (MP) of the Parliament of England for East Grinstead in 1529.

References

16th-century deaths
People from East Grinstead
English MPs 1529–1536
Year of birth uncertain